AmeriSpeak is a nationally-representative panel of survey respondents from households across the United States. Created in 2014 by NORC at the University of Chicago, AmeriSpeak members take surveys on various topics such as new consumer goods and services, current events, government programs, health care, media usage, and political and social issues.

Membership 

AmeriSpeak membership is by invite only, to ensure that it represents a cross-section of U.S. households.  AmeriSpeak scientifically and randomly selects members by address, inviting any adult and teen living at that address to participate.  Members may register and participate in surveys either by phone or internet, and receive cash-equivalent rewards for participating.

Published studies 

The AmeriSpeak Panel has been published in various national media.  Below are some examples:

 Associated Press (AP): Many youths say high school diploma is enough
 The New York Times: Americans Blame Obesity on Willpower, Despite Evidence It's Genetic
 Fox News: Two-thirds of US would struggle to cover $1,000 emergency
 AP News: AP-NORC Poll: Health care is the issue that won’t go away
 The New York Times: In Protests of Net Neutrality Repeal, Teenage Voices Stood Out
 Just Capital: Rediscovering our Moral Compass, JUST Capital’s 2017 List of America’s Most JUST Companies 
 The Associated Press-NORC: New Year, Same Priorities: The Public's Agenda for 2018
 The Associated Press-NORC: The Problem and Impact of Sexual Misconduct
 The Washington Post: 79 percent of Americans would take a pay cut to work for a more ‘just’ company
 USA Today: Veterans are prime targets for phone scams, pitches for upfront benefits buyouts
 WebMD: Credentials Don’t Shield Doctors, Nurses from Bias
 The Associated Press-NORC: Long-Term Caregiving, The Types of Care Older Americans Provide and the Impact on Work and Family
 Space Ref: A Record Number of Americans Viewed the 2017 Solar Eclipse
 The New York Times: Can You Develop Food Allergies at Any Age?
 The Washington Post: Teens who spend less time in front of screens are happier — up to a point, new research shows
 Scientific American: What Americans Think of Human Enhancement Technologies
 NORC: NORC Uses Predictive Analytics and an AmeriSpeak Survey to Answer Important Questions About "Hamilton: An American Musical"

Methodology 

AmeriSpeak is a probability-based panel, meaning that respondents have a non-zero chance of selection.  AmeriSpeak households are drawn from NORC National Frame, an area probability sample funded and managed by NORC and used for several NORC studies including the General Social Survey and the Survey of Consumer Finances. NORC’s National Frame is designed to provide over 99% sample coverage by supplementing the USPS Delivery Sequence File.

References

External links 
 AmeriSpeak
 NORC at the University of Chicago
 AP-NORC Center for Public Affairs

Surveys (human research)
University of Chicago